Tom Sutherland may refer to:

 Tom Sutherland (sport shooter), New Zealand rifle shooter
 Tom Sutherland (footballer) (1910–1981), Australian rules footballer
 Tom Sutherland (racing driver)